"Born Again" is the sixth episode of third season of the American television drama series The Americans, and the 32nd overall episode of the series. It originally aired on March 4, 2015 in the United States on FX.

Plot
Paige gets baptized by Pastor Tim, with Philip and Elizabeth in attendance. Later, Tori and Stan have dinner at the Jennings house, and despite his admitting that he still considers Sandra his wife, he and Tori have sex. Gabriel informs Philip that his other son is now a soldier in Afghanistan. This causes Philip to increase his visits with Kimmy to check the phone taps. Kimmy tries to seduce Philip. Meanwhile, Nina portrays herself as vulnerable to get Evi to confess about her boyfriend's treason. Evi gets taken away and Nina gets rewarded with a meal.

Production
The episode was written by Tracey Scott Wilson and directed by Kevin Dowling.

Reception
The episode was watched by 930,000 viewers and scored 0.24 ratings in 18–49 demographics, as per Nielsen ratings.

"Born Again" received positive reviews. Erik Adams of The A.V. Club gave the episode a B+ grade. Alan Sepinwall also reviewed it positively.

References

External links
 "Born Again" at FX
 

2015 American television episodes
The Americans (season 3) episodes